Daniel Martí Lluch (born 23 April 1973 in Barcelona, Catalonia) is a retired Spanish pole vaulter. His personal best jump was 5.70 metres, achieved in June 1994 in Lisbon.

Achievements

References

sports-reference

1973 births
Living people
Spanish male pole vaulters
Athletes (track and field) at the 1992 Summer Olympics
Olympic athletes of Spain
Athletes from Catalonia
Athletes (track and field) at the 1993 Mediterranean Games
Mediterranean Games competitors for Spain